is a diplomat, who served as UN Secretary-General's Special Representative for Afghanistan and head of the UN Assistance Mission in Afghanistan (UNAMA) until replaced by Deborah Lyons in March 2020.

Previously, he served as the Secretary-General’s Deputy Special Representative for Afghanistan dating back to November 2014.  He also served as Ambassador of Japan to Hungary in 2012 and was the special representative of the Government of Japan for Pakistan and Afghanistan from 2010 to 2012. Yamamoto also coordinated a ministerial-level international conference on Afghan development, which was held in Tokyo, Japan in July 2012.

He completed his Bachelor of Science degree in engineering from the Tokyo Institute of Technology and a bachelor’s degree from the University of Oxford.

References

Living people
Ambassadors of Japan to Hungary
1950 births
Special Representatives of the Secretary-General of the United Nations
Alumni of the University of Oxford